Scrobipalpa orientalis is a moth in the family Gelechiidae. It was described by Povolný in 1968. It is found in Pakistan.

References

Scrobipalpa
Moths described in 1968